Adolf Cillien (April 23, 1893 – April 29, 1960) was a German politician of the Christian Democratic Union (CDU) and former member of the German Bundestag.

Life 
Cillien became a member of the appointed Hannover Landtag on 23 August 1946 until 29 October 1946. There he was chairman of the CDU state parliament faction as well as chairman of the committee for popular education, art and science. Between 9 December 1946 and 23 March 1947, he was a member of the appointed Lower Saxony State Parliament and subsequently became a member of the Lower Saxony State Parliament in the first legislative period between 20 April 1947 and 30 April 1951. There he became chairman of the CDU parliamentary group and later chairman of the DP/CDU parliamentary group (since 28 March 1951). On 9 May 1947 he was elected chairman of the Culture Committee.

Cillien was a member of the German Bundestag from 1953 until his death. He was directly elected in the constituency of Hildesheim-Stadt und -Land in 1953 and in the constituency of Stadt Hannover-Nord in 1957. During his parliamentary term, he was deputy chairman of the CDU/CSU parliamentary group throughout.

Literature

References

1893 births
1960 deaths
Members of the Bundestag for Lower Saxony
Members of the Bundestag 1957–1961
Members of the Bundestag 1953–1957
Members of the Bundestag for the Christian Democratic Union of Germany
Members of the Landtag of Lower Saxony